Kenichi Kumagai (born 17 March 1927) is a Japanese former sports shooter. He competed in the trap event at the 1960 Summer Olympics.

References

External links
 

1927 births
Possibly living people
Japanese male sport shooters
Olympic shooters of Japan
Shooters at the 1960 Summer Olympics
Sportspeople from Aichi Prefecture